Marquesan reed warbler has been split into the following two species:
 Northern Marquesan reed warbler, 	Acrocephalus percernis
 Southern Marquesan reed warbler, 	Acrocephalus mendanae